Drifton is an unincorporated community in Jefferson County, Florida, United States.  It is located near the intersection of US 19 and County Road 158.

Drifton was formerly the site where the ACL's Southland route crossed at grade the route of SAL's Gulf Wind.  The ACL route has long been abandoned, and the former SAL route was acquired from CSX by the Florida Gulf & Atlantic Railroad on June 1, 2019.

Geography

Education
Jefferson County Schools operates public schools, including Jefferson County Middle / High School.

Notable person
William H. Hay, a major general in the United States Army who commanded the 28th Division in World War I, was born in Drifton.

References

Unincorporated communities in Jefferson County, Florida
Tallahassee metropolitan area
Unincorporated communities in Florida